Erin Oban is an American politician from the state of North Dakota. She is a former member of the North Dakota Senate for the 35th district and the North Dakota Democratic-Nonpartisan League Party.

Early life 

Oban earned a Bachelor of Science in mathematics education from the University of Mary. She previously taught math at a junior high school.

Political career 

Earlier in her career, Oban worked for U.S. Representative Earl Pomeroy, 2012 gubernatorial candidate Ryan Taylor, and Tobacco Free North Dakota.

Oban defeated incumbent Republican State Senator Margaret Sitte in the 2014 elections by 58% to 41%, becoming the first Democrat to represent Bismarck since 2010. She was inspired to run by Sitte's support of a Human Life Amendment to the North Dakota Constitution. Oban was re-elected in 2018.

In November 2021, Oban announced she would not run for re-election, citing a toxic environment in state politics. On March 17, 2022, the White House announced her appointment as USDA Rural Development state director for North Dakota. She will resign her role as state senator on March 27 and start the new role March 28. Former Senator Tracy Potter, who had announced his candidacy for the 35th district after Oban's retirement announcement, was appointed to the vacancy.

Electoral record

References

External links

Living people
Schoolteachers from North Dakota
American women educators
Democratic Party North Dakota state senators
21st-century American politicians
1982 births
Women state legislators in North Dakota
Politicians from Bismarck, North Dakota
People from Williams County, North Dakota
21st-century American women politicians